The Rookery Building is a historic office building located at 209 South LaSalle Street in the Chicago Loop. Completed by architects Daniel Burnham and John Wellborn Root  of Burnham and Root in 1888, it is considered one of their masterpiece buildings, and was once the location of their offices. It has a unique construction style featuring exterior load-bearing walls and an interior steel frame, providing a transition between accepted and new building techniques. The lobby was remodeled in 1905 by Frank Lloyd Wright. From 1989 to 1992, the lobby was restored to Wright's design.

The building was designated a Chicago Landmark on July 5, 1972, and was added to the National Register of Historic Places on April 17, 1970 and listed as a National Historic Landmark on May 15, 1975.

Name
The name is a reference to the temporary building that occupied the land before the current structure. After the Great Chicago Fire, a quickly constructed building was used as an interim city hall, built around a large water tank that had survived the fire. That building was nicknamed the "rookery", in reference to the crows and pigeons that flocked to its exterior, as well as the alleged corrupt politicians it housed. Several other names were considered when the new structure on the site was proposed, but The Rookery won out.

Construction

Burnham & Root

The Rookery was built in 1886 by the architectural partnership of Daniel H. Burnham and John Wellborn Root, known as Burnham and Root. In the architectural boom that followed the Great Chicago Fire, architects in what would become known as the Chicago School of commercial architecture competed with each other to create the world's first true skyscrapers.  By mixing modern building techniques, such as metal framing, fireproofing, elevators and plate glass, together with traditional ones, such as brick facades and elaborate ornamentation, Burnham and Root sought to create a bold architectural statement.  At the same time, they intended their buildings to be commercially successful.  This building is one of the few results of their partnership that is still standing.

As the master artisan, Root drew upon a variety of influences in designing the interior and exterior spaces, including Moorish, Byzantine, Venetian and Romanesque motifs. He also provided the architectural innovations that brought together many contemporary cutting edge building techniques. Of particular note was a "floating" foundation—a reinforced concrete slab that provided the building's weight with a solid platform atop Chicago's notoriously swampy soil.  The term for the type of foundation that Root designed is grillage foundation, a foundation where iron rails and the structural beams are combined in a crisscross pattern and encased in concrete to support the building's immense weight without heavy foundation stones.  This construction is particularly useful when structural loads are high compared to the natural bearing capacity of the soil.

Light court
Making prodigious use of light and ornamentation, Root and Burnham designed a central light court to serve as the focal point for the entire building and provide daylight to interior offices.  Rising two stories, the light court received immediate critical acclaim. "There is nothing bolder, more original, or more inspiring in modern civic architecture than its glass-covered court", wrote Eastern critic Henry Van Brunt. At a time when Chicago's bold experiment in architecture was looking eastward for affirmation, this was welcome praise.  The light court provides natural illumination for the interior offices.

Frank Lloyd Wright was a young architectural assistant working with Adler and Sullivan at the time the Rookery was finished in 1888. Architect Daniel Burnham was a friend of Wright patron Edward  C. Waller.  Waller managed the Rookery; Wright had his offices in the building in 1898–1899.  In 1905 Wright received the commission to redesign the lobby in the building; at the time considered the grandest in Chicago. Wright's work on the Rookery recast the entryway in his Prairie style and added a sense of modernity through his simple but effective lighting design. Wright's work on the Rookery is his only work on any building within the downtown cityscape.

Among Wright's most significant alterations was the addition of white marble with Persian-style ornamentation.  The marble and decorative details added a sense of luxury to the lobby's steel-laden interior, marked by Burnham and Root's skeletal metal ribbing. The entire interior space is bright and open. A double set of curving, heavily ornamented stairs wind upward from the lobby's second floor into the building's interior. A wrap-around balcony on the second floor enhances the feeling of being within the interior of a "clockwork." The Wright remodel opened the building up to more of the available light.

Load bearing walls and steel structure
The red marble and granite, terra cotta and brick facade of the building is a combination of Roman Revival and Queen Anne styles that embraced Richardsonian Romanesque architecture. The building, which is a combination of iron framing and masonry bearing walls, marked a transition from masonry load-bearing structures to steel skeleton load-bearing structures. In fact, the Landmarks Commission citation commends "development of the skeleton structural frame using cast iron columns, wrought iron spandrel beams, and steel beams to support party walls and interior floors". Aside from the first two floors of metal-framed perimeter walls, the walls are all masonry. The building is known for its semi-circular staircase west of the light court.

Renovations

While much of the Loop's 19th-century architecture has been lost to demolition and redevelopment, the Rookery has been spared this fate through a series of well executed renovations. The building remains a commercially successful rental office building, as it was when it was first built.

Beginning in the early 20th century, the building underwent three major renovations. In the first, from 1905 to 1907, Frank Lloyd Wright was retained to remake the interior spaces. In keeping with contemporary tastes, Wright's design covered Root's elaborate wrought iron finishes with white carved Carrara marble surfaces. Wright was highly regarded by the public at this point, and his changes brought enhanced status to the building, making the Rookery one of the most sought after buildings of Chicago. Some of Wright's other changes included incorporating simplified ironwork and adding his trademark style planters and light fixtures.

The second renovation, completed August 24, 1931 by former Wright assistant William Drummond, modernized many of the interior elements, including new elevators, and brought period touches to the building, such as Art Deco detailing. The third renovation, in 1992 by Daprato Rigali Studios, brought the building back to much of its original splendor, reopening the light court ceiling after it had been covered over to protect against leaks.

After their purchase of the Rookery in October 2007, the new owners announced plans for an extensive renovation of the building's common areas. In 2011, Office for Visual Interaction completed the lighting design for the facade, illuminating the architectural features of the building with state-of-the-art LED technology. The Rookery achieved LEED Gold certification in 2014. In 2015 the restrooms were upgraded and a full-featured bike room was added. Additionally, a full elevator modernization was completed, inclusive of a destination dispatch and visitor system in 2017.

Tenants
Burnham & Root had their offices at the Rookery for a while upon its completion, and at one time Frank Lloyd Wright had an office in the building as well. Current tenants include US Bank, Brooks Brothers, Perkins Eastman and Interactive Brokers Group.

Current ownership

The building was purchased in October 2007 for $73 million by an investment group controlled by a European family, and advised by Zeb Bradford of Metzler North America Corp. The seller was Broadway Real Estate Partners of New York, which had bought the Rookery for $56 million in April 2006. BREP was reported to have increased occupancy of the building's  from 80% in January 2007 to 96% at the time of the sale.

Visiting
The Frank Lloyd Wright Trust offers tours inside Mondays through Fridays. Inside Chicago Walking Tours offers daily walking tours that explore the interior of the Rookery in addition to many other historic Chicago buildings.  The Chicago Architecture Foundation also provides tours twice a month.

In popular culture
The Rookery Building was featured in the film Home Alone 2: Lost in New York, in which the exterior and one of the lower levels were modeled as the toy store Duncan's Toy Chest.
The Rookery was used by Frank Norris in his novel The Pit as the site of the office of fictional financial speculator Curtis Jadwin.
The Rookery was featured prominently in the 1987 film The Untouchables as the police headquarters of Eliot Ness.

See also 
Early skyscrapers
J.H.C. Petersen's Sons' Store, a small-scale version of the building located in Davenport, Iowa.

References
Notes

 Storrer, William Allin. The Frank Lloyd Wright Companion. University Of Chicago Press, 2006,  (S.113)

External links

 Official Rookery Building website
 Rookery Building — City of Chicago Dept. of Planning and Development webpage on the building.
 Emporis Buildings: The Rookery 
 A National Register of Historic Places Travel Itinerary of Chicago
 Tour the Rookery with Inside Chicago Walking Tours
 Chicago Architecture Foundation's webpage about the building
 Picture of the "Old Rookery" Water Tower and City Hall after the Great Chicago Fire

Skyscraper office buildings in Chicago
Burnham and Root buildings
Central Chicago
Chicago school architecture in Illinois
Office buildings completed in 1888
Commercial buildings on the National Register of Historic Places in Chicago
Frank Lloyd Wright buildings
National Historic Landmarks in Chicago
Art Nouveau architecture in Chicago
Art Nouveau commercial buildings
Chicago Landmarks
1888 establishments in Illinois